Do It may refer to:

Music
Do It Records, a British record label

Albums
Do It (GJan album) or the title song, 2017
Do It ('Til You're Satisfied) (album), by B. T. Express, or the title song (see below), 1974
Do It! (album), by Clinic, 2008
Do It (EP), by Rollins Band, or the title cover of the Pink Fairies song (see below), 1987

Songs
"Do It" (Chloe x Halle song), 2020
"Do It" (Nelly Furtado song), 2007
"Do It" (Rasheeda song), 2000
"Do It" (Toni Braxton song), 2020
"Do It ('Til You're Satisfied)", by B. T. Express, 1974
"Do It!" (song), by Mai Kuraki, 2018
"Dooo It!", by Miley Cyrus, 2015
"Big Shit Poppin' (Do It)", by T.I., 2007
"Do It", by the Beastie Boys from Ill Communication, 1994
"Do It", by Ciara from Ciara: The Evolution, 2006
"Do It", by Dead or Alive from Sophisticated Boom Boom, 1984
"Do It", by Dizzee Rascal from Boy in da Corner, 2003
"Do It", by the Doors from Soft Parade, 1969
"Do It!", by the Flaming Lips and Yoko Ono/Plastic Ono Band from The Flaming Lips and Heady Fwends, 2012
"Do It", by iamnot, 2015
"Do It", by Kaytranada from Bubba, 2019
"Do It", by KC and the Sunshine Band from All in a Night's Work, 1982
"Do It", by Keri Hilson from In a Perfect World..., 2009
"Do It", by Neil Diamond, the B-side of "Solitary Man", 1966
"Do It", by the Pink Fairies from Never Never Land, 1971
"Do It", by Pussycat, the B-side of "Mississippi", 1975
"Do It", by Selena Gomez from For You, 2014
"Do It", by the Spice Girls from Spiceworld, 1997
"Do It", by Swoop from Thriller, 1993
"Do It", by Tuxedo from Tuxedo, 2015

Other uses 
Do It (TV series), an Australian lifestyle program
Do It!, a 1980s children's TV programme presented by Sheelagh Gilbey
Do It!: Scenarios of the Revolution, a 1970 book by Jerry Rubin

See also
 
 Doin' It (disambiguation)
 Doit (disambiguation)